Iris Adrian Hostetter (May 29, 1912 – September 17, 1994) was an American stage, film actress and dancer.

Life and career
Adrian was an only child, born in Los Angeles, California, to Florence (née Van Every) and Adrian Earl Hostetter, who wed in 1909 in Los Angeles. She was raised by her single mother in Los Angeles. She was a graduate of Hollywood High School.

Adrian won a beauty pageant, worked with the Ziegfeld Follies, and performed with Fred Waring before she entered films at the end of the silent era in Chasing Husbands (1928) and appeared as an extra or chorus girl in early sound films like Paramount on Parade (1930).

During the 1930s she specialised in playing hard-boiled gals, glamorous gold-diggers, and gangsters' "molls". She played supporting roles in numerous features. She played "Gee-Gee Graham" in Lady of Burlesque. In the Jerry Lewis comedy, The Errand Boy, she played a glamorous movie star "Anastasia Anastasia", whose on-set birthday party is wrecked by Lewis's shenanigans. She appeared on several radio programs, including the Abbott and Costello Show.

She acted regularly, albeit without achieving star status, and by the end of the 1960s had appeared in more than one hundred films. In her later years she appeared in several Walt Disney films, including That Darn Cat!, The Love Bug, The Shaggy D.A., Freaky Friday, and No Deposit, No Return. Disney director Robert Stevenson considered Adrian his "good-luck charm". On television, she was a member of the cast of the unsuccessful situation comedy The Ted Knight Show in the spring of 1978. She also played numerous guest roles in television series such as Get Smart, Green Acres, Petticoat Junction, The Munsters, The Love Boat, The Lucy Show, The Beverly Hillbillies, and The Jack Benny Show.

Personal life
Adrian was married to Charles Over from 1935 to 1936; the marriage ended in divorce. Her second marriage, to George Jay, also ended in divorce. On September 24, 1949, she married Dan Schoonmaker, a camera manufacturer, in Las Vegas. They separated two months later and were divorced on September 14, 1950, in Ciudad Juárez. Her fourth and final marriage was to football player Ray (Fido) Murphy, and lasted more than 30 years until his death in 1983.

None of the marriages produced children.

Death
Adrian died in Los Angeles, from complications from a hip injury sustained during the 1994 Northridge earthquake eight months earlier. Her ashes are within the Columbarium of Radiant Dawn at the Forest Lawn, Hollywood Hills Cemetery in Los Angeles.

Filmography

Features

 The Vagabond King (1930) as Extra (uncredited)
 Lord Byron of Broadway (1930) as Lady In The Audience (uncredited)
 Paramount on Parade (1930) as Chorus Girl (uncredited)
 Let's Go Native (1930) as Chorine (uncredited)
 Midnight Daddies (1930) as Model (uncredited)
 Rumba (1935) as Goldie Allen
 Stolen Harmony (1935) as Sunny Verne
 The Gay Deception (1935) as  Gettel's Wife (uncredited)
 Murder at Glen Athol (1935) 
 Grand Exit (1935) as Diane, First Secretary (uncredited)
 A Message to Garcia (1936) as Muriel Randel
 One Rainy Afternoon (1936) as Cashier (uncredited)
 Stage Struck (1936) as Ms. LaRue (uncredited)
 Lady Luck (1936) as Rita
 Our Relations (1936) as Alice
 Mr. Cinderella (1936) as Lil, Maizie's Friend
 Gold Diggers of 1937 (1936) as Verna (uncredited)
 ...One Third of a Nation... (1939) as Myrtle
 Back Door to Heaven (1939) as Sugar, Burlesque Dancer
 Meet the Wildcat (1940) as Jail Cell Blonde
 Go West (1940) as Mary Lou (uncredited)
 Meet the Chump (1941) as Switchboard Operator (uncredited)
 Horror Island (1941) as Arleen Grady
 The Lady from Cheyenne (1941) as Chorus Girl (uncredited)
 Road to Zanzibar (1941) as French Soubrette
 Too Many Blondes (1941) as Hortense Kent
 Wild Geese Calling (1941) as Mazie
 Sing Another Chorus (1941) as Francine La Verne
 Hard Guy (1941) as Goldie Duvall
 New York Town (1941) as Toots O'Day (uncredited)
 Swing It Soldier (1941) as Dena Maxwellton
 I Killed That Man (1941) as Verne Drake
 Roxie Hart (1942) as 'Two-Gun' Gertie Baxter
 Rings on Her Fingers (1942) as Peggy
 To the Shores of Tripoli (1942) as Okay's Girlfriend (uncredited)
 Juke Box Jenny (1942) as Jinx Corey
 Fingers at the Window (1942) as Babe Stanton (uncredited)
 Broadway (1942) as Maisie
 Moonlight Masquerade (1942) as Contestant (uncredited)
 Orchestra Wives (1942) as Wisecracking Blonde in Bus Station (uncredited)
 Highways by Night (1942) as Blonde Chorine
 Thunder Birds (1942) (Not Listed - Reshot with Joyce Comton)
 McGuerins From Brooklyn (Two Mugs From Brooklyn) (1942)
 The Crystal Ball (1943) as Mrs. Angela Martin (uncredited)
 Calaboose (1943) as Gert, aka Ma, Sluggy's Moll
 He's My Guy (1943) as Chorus Girl (uncredited)
 Ladies' Day (1943) as Kitty McClouen
 Taxi, Mister (1943) as Diner Waitress
 Lady of Burlesque (1943) as Gee Gee Graham
 Action in the North Atlantic (1943) as Jenny O'Hara (uncredited)
 Hers to Hold (1943) as Arlene
 Submarine Base (1943) as Dorothy
 Spotlight Scandals (1943) as Bernice
 His Butler's Sister (1943) as Sunshine Twin
 Career Girl (1944) as Glenda Benton
 Million Dollar Kid (1944) as Mazie Dunbar
 Shake Hands with Murder (1944) as Patsy Brent
 Once Upon a Time (1944) as Theatregoer (uncredited)
 The Singing Sheriff (1944) as Lefty
 Swing Hostess (1944) as Marge O'Day
 I'm from Arkansas (1944) as Doris
 The Woman in the Window (1944) as Streetwalker (uncredited)
 Bluebeard (1944) as Mimi Robert
 Alaska (1944) as Kitty
 It's a Pleasure (1945) as Wilma
 Boston Blackie's Rendezvous (1945) as Martha
 Steppin' in Society (1945) as Shirley
 Road to Alcatraz (1945) as Louise Rogers
 The Stork Club (1945) as Gwen
 The Bamboo Blonde (1946) as Montana Jones
 Vacation in Reno (1946) as Bunny Wells
 Cross My Heart (1946) as Miss Baggart
 Fall Guy (1947) as Mrs. Ed Sindell
 Philo Vance Returns (1947) as Maggie McCarthy Blendon, aka Choo-choo Divine
 Love and Learn (1947) as New Danceland Hostess (uncredited)
 The Trouble with Women (1947) as Rita La May
 The Wistful Widow of Wagon Gap (1947) 
 Smart Woman (1948) as Newspaper Columnist (uncredited)
 Out of the Storm (1948) as Ginger
 The Paleface (1948) as Pepper
 Miss Mink of 1949 (1949) as Mrs. McKelvey
 My Dream Is Yours (1949) as Peggy (uncredited)
 Sky Dragon (1949) as Wanda LaFern
 Flamingo Road (1949) as Blanche - Inmate of Women's Prison (uncredited)
 The Lovable Cheat (1949) as Madame Mercadet
 Mighty Joe Young (1949) as Gloria (uncredited)
 Trail of the Yukon (1949) as Paula
 Woman On Pier 13 (1949) as Club Waitress (uncredited)
 Tough Assignment (1949) as Gloria
 Always Leave Them Laughing (1949) as Julie Adams
 Bodyhold (1949) as Aggie (uncredited)
 There's a Girl in My Heart (1950) as Lulu Troy
 Blondie's Hero (1950) as Mae
 Joe Palooka in Humphrey Takes a Chance (1950) as Miss Tuttle
 Sideshow (1950) as Nellie
 Once a Thief (1950) as Pearl
 Hi-Jacked (1950) as Aggie
 Hunt the Man Down (1950) as Marie (uncredited)
 Stop That Cab (1951) as Lucy
 The Scarf (1951) as Floozy (uncredited)
 Varieties on Parade (1951) as Herself
 G.I. Jane (1951) as Lt. Adrian
 My Favorite Spy (1951) as Lola
 The Big Trees (1952)
 Carson City (1952) as Saloon Girl in Fight (uncredited)
 Crime Wave (1953) as Hastings' Girlfriend (uncredited)
 Take the High Ground! (1953) as Mrs. Butterfly (scenes deleted)
 Highway Dragnet (1954) as Dolly
 The Fast and the Furious (1955) as Wilma Belding, Waitress
 The Helen Morgan Story (1957) as Louise Jensen - Secretary (uncredited)
 Carnival Rock (1957) as Celia
 The Buccaneer (1958) as Capt. Brown's Frowsy Wench
 Blue Hawaii (1961) as Enid Garvey
 The Errand Boy (1961) as Anastasia Anastasia, Actress
 Fate Is the Hunter (1964) as Woman (uncredited)
 That Darn Cat! (1965) as Landlady
 The Odd Couple (1968) as Waitress
 The Love Bug (1968) as Carhop
 The Barefoot Executive (1971) as Woman Shopper
 Scandalous John (1971) as Mavis
 The Apple Dumpling Gang (1975) as Poker Polly
 No Deposit, No Return (1976) as Housewife
 Gus (1976) as Fan's Wife
 The Shaggy D.A. (1976) as Manageress
 Freaky Friday (1976) as Bus Passenger
 Herbie Goes Bananas (1980) as Loud American Wife

Short subjects
 Chasing Husbands (1928)
 Whirls and Girls (1929) as 4th Girl (unconfirmed)
 The Freshman's Goat 20 min.. (1930)
 Don't Give Up (1930)
 College Cuties 19 min. (1930) as Iris
 Man to Man (1937) 
 How to Clean House 18 min. (1948) as Isabella, The Maid
 Foy Meets Girl 17 min. (1950)
 Heebie Gee-Gees (1952) as Wally's Wife
 So You Want To Know Your Relatives 10 min. (1954) as Bubbles LaVonne (uncredited)
 So You Want to Be Pretty 10 min. (1956) as Mabel - Nurse (uncredited)

Sources
Terrace, Vincent. Radio Programs, 1924-1984. Jefferson, NC: McFarland, 1999; 
Cocchi, John. "The Films of Iris Adrian, 1972", The Real Stars. Curtis Books, 1973
Maltin, Leonard."Interviews with Iris Adrian, 1972-73", The Real Stars 2, Curtis Books, 1973

References

Further reading

External links

1912 births
1994 deaths
American female dancers
Dancers from California
American musical theatre actresses
American television actresses
Actresses from Los Angeles
Ziegfeld girls
20th-century American actresses
American film actresses
Burials at Forest Lawn Memorial Park (Hollywood Hills)
20th-century American singers
20th-century American women singers
20th-century American dancers
Natural disaster deaths in California
Deaths in earthquakes